is a 1976 Japanese film directed by Tadashi Imai. It is the second remake of the award-winning 1935 novel of the same name by Saisei Murō. The original film version, directed by Sotoji Kimura, was released in 1936, and the first remake, directed by Mikio Naruse and starring Masayuki Mori and Machiko Kyo, was released in 1953. It won Golden Peacock (Best Film) at the 5th International Film Festival of India.

Cast
 Kumiko Akiyoshi as Mon
 Masao Kusakari as Inokichi 
 Hideji Ōtaki as Akaza
 Kimiko Ikegami as San
 Natsuko Kahara as Riki
 Atomu Shimojō as Kobata
 Keizō Kanie as Kifuji

Awards and nominations
1st Hochi Film Award 
 Won: Best Actress - Kumiko Akiyoshi
 Won: Best Supporting Actor - Hideji Ōtaki

References

External links
 
 

1976 films
Films directed by Imai Tadashi
1970s Japanese-language films
Toho films
1970s Japanese films